Fayiz Muhammed is an Indian violinist trained in Carnatic music and Western Classical Music.

Early life
Fayiz was born in Aluva to Saidu Muhammed T M and Shyla Saidu Muhammed. He was introduced to Violin as a child and started taking lessons in Carnatic and Western Classical Music from Kalabhavan at the age of 14. He did his graduation in Commerce from Union Christian College, Aluva.

Performing career
In 2016, he started a fusion band, Red Viola with eight other musicians while studying in college. The band does fusion covers of popular Indian songs. He has performed musical shows in India and abroad and has collaborated with  Vijay Sethupathi, Dhanush and artists Vaishnav Girish and Niranj Suresh at Asiavision Awards in 2019. He was part of a concert staged at Global Village (Dubai) featuring 44 musicians from different countries.

He composed the theme music for the 19th edition of beauty pageant, Miss Kerala. In 2019, he made a cameo appearance as a violinist in the Malayalam film Pathinettam Padi.

References

External links 

 Facebook

Living people
1997 births
Violinists
Indian violinists
21st-century violinists
Musicians from Kochi